Hereford City Council elections are held every four years. The current Hereford City Council was established in 2000 as a parish council, following the abolition in 1998 of the former district council that had also been called Hereford City Council.

Political control
Hereford was an ancient borough and had held city status from time immemorial. Hereford City Council had its powers significantly reformed under the Local Government Act 1972, becoming a non-metropolitan district, although retaining the same boundaries. The first elections to the reconstituted city council were held in 1973, initially operating as a shadow authority before coming into its powers on 1 April 1974. From 1974 until the abolition of the district council in 1998, political control of the council was held by the following parties:

In 1998 the district of Hereford was abolished, with the area becoming part of the new unitary authority of Herefordshire. The Herefordshire councillors who represented the former district of Hereford acted as charter trustees from 1998 until 2000, when a civil parish covering the former district was formed, with its parish council taking the name Hereford City Council. As a parish council rather than a district council, the post-2000 city council has fewer powers and responsibilities than the pre-1998 city council had.

Council elections
Elections to the non-metropolitan district council which existed from 1974 to 1998 were generally held three years out of every four, with a third of the council elected each time.
1973 Hereford City Council election
1976 Hereford City Council election
1979 Hereford City Council election (New ward boundaries)
1980 Hereford City Council election
1982 Hereford City Council election
1983 Hereford City Council election
1984 Hereford City Council election
1986 Hereford City Council election
1987 Hereford City Council election
1988 Hereford City Council election
1990 Hereford City Council election
1991 Hereford City Council election
1992 Hereford City Council election
1994 Hereford City Council election
1995 Hereford City Council election
1996 Hereford City Council election

References

External links

 
Politics of Hereford
Council elections in Hereford and Worcester
District council elections in England